A list of films produced in Myanmar (Burma). Film production began in Burma in the 1910s and has produced many motion pictures, although many films have been lost or concealed for political reasons.

1920s

1930s

1940s

1950s

1960s

1970s

1980s

1990s

2000s

2010s

2020s

References

Burma
 
Films